Boin is the last name shared by the following people:
Arjen Boin, editor of Public Administration, a peer-reviewed academic journal
Bruno Boin (b. 1937), American basketball player
Jean Boin (1949–2020), French footballer
Sara Boin-Webb, a co-founder of Buddhist Studies Review, a peer-reviewed academic journal
Victor Boin (1886–1974), Belgian freestyle swimmer, water polo player, and épée fencer

See also
Choi Bo-in, Korean beauty pageant contestant